Anatoly Klebanov (8 October 1952 – 5 December 2011) was a Soviet water polo player. He competed in the men's tournament at the 1976 Summer Olympics.

See also
 Soviet Union men's Olympic water polo team records and statistics
 List of men's Olympic water polo tournament goalkeepers
 List of world champions in men's water polo
 List of World Aquatics Championships medalists in water polo

References

External links
 

1952 births
2011 deaths
People from Zhodzina
Soviet male water polo players
Water polo goalkeepers
Olympic water polo players of the Soviet Union
Water polo players at the 1976 Summer Olympics